is a Japanese model, film and television actor, and television presenter signed to Ken-On. His second son, Kōta Nomura is also an actor.

Biography
Ikki Sawamura was born in Kagoshima in 1967. After graduating from the local high school, he moved to Tokyo and started his career as a fashion model. In 1996, Sawamura debuted in a TV drama Matsuda no Drama as an actor.  Since then, he has appeared in many television dramas and commercials. Sawamura married a Japanese ex-model in 2000, and has three sons.

In public and some variety shows, Sawamura often portrays his character as a sexually perverted personality. He is also a well-known fan of Bruce Lee. His hobbies are playing tennis, playing billiards and watching movies.

Filmography

Movies
 (1997)
 (2006)
 (2006)
 (2009)
 (2009)
 (2009)
 (2010)
 (2016)
Ossan's Love: Love or Dead (2019)
Love and the Grand Tug-of-war (2021)
Masquerade Night (2021)

TV dramas
1996

, as 
1997
, as 
, as 
, as 
1998
Days, as guest appearance
, as 
, as 
, as 
1999
, as 
, as 
, as 
, as 
, as 
2000
, as 
, as 
2001
, as 
, as 
, as 
2002
, as 
, as 
, as 
2003
, as 
, as  since Ep.7
, as 
, as 
, as 
, as 
2004
, as 
, as 
, as 
, as 
2005
, as 
, as  since chapter 3
, as 
2006
, as 
, as 
, as 
, as himself in Ep.7
, as 
2007
, as 
, as 
, as 
, as 
2008
, as 
, as 
, as 
2011
, as 一
2017
, as 
2018
, as 
, as 
2022
The Files of Young Kindaichi as Isamu Kenmochi

Asami Mitsuhiko series
 is a mystery novel series created by Japanese author Yasuo Uchida. Many of the novels have been made into 2 hour one-episode drama by several different networks with the different casts. Sawamura played the protagonist Mitsuhiko Asami from part 14 in the series originally aired on TBS.

Part 14  (September 4, 2000)
Part 15  (March 19, 2001)
Part 16  (September 24, 2001)
Part 17  (September 23, 2002)
Part 18  (January 5, 2004)
Part 19  (April 12, 2004)
Part 20  (March 14, 2005)
Part 21  (December 26, 2005)
Part 22  (September 25, 2006)
Part 23  (March 26, 2007)
Part 24  (October 15, 2007)
Part 25  (April 7, 2008)

Voice acting
, as David (2004)
Journey to the Center of the Earth, as Prof. Trevor Anderson in the Japanese dubbed version (2008)
Yakuza 4, as Hiroaki Arai (2010)

Other works

TV shows
Ururun Taizaiki in Germany (September, 1998)
Ururun Taizaiki in China (April, 2001)
NEO - Office Chuckles - main cast (2005-ongoing)
Ai no Muchi - presenter (October–December, 2006)
The Future Professor Sawamura - presenter (October, 2007-April, 2008)
The Future Professor Sawamura Z - presenter (April, 2008-ongoing)
ITSUZAI - presenter (October, 2007-ongoing)
Tokyo-Kawaii TV - host (April, 2008-ongoing) 
'Downtown no Gaki no Tsukai ya Arahende!!- cameo in No-Laughing Spy Batsu game(December 2011)

Commercials

References

External links
 
 
Ikki Sawamura official web site 
Ken-On official profile 

1967 births
Living people
Japanese male film actors
Japanese male television actors
Japanese male models
Japanese television personalities
People from Kagoshima
Ken-On artists